Dame Antonia Susan Duffy  ( Drabble; born 24 August 1936), known professionally by her former marriage name as A. S. Byatt, is an English critic, novelist, poet and short story writer. Her books have been widely translated, into more than thirty languages.

After attending the University of Cambridge, she married in 1959 and moved to Durham. It was during Byatt's time at university that she began work on her first two novels, subsequently published by Chatto & Windus as Shadow of a Sun (1964; reprinted in 1991 with its originally intended title, The Shadow of the Sun) and The Game (1967). Byatt took a teaching job in 1972 so as to help pay for the education of her only son. In the same week she accepted, a drunk driver killed her son as he walked home from school. He was 11 years of age. Byatt spent a symbolic 11 years teaching (the same length of time as her son had lived), then began full-time writing in 1983. The Virgin in the Garden (1978) was the first of The Quartet, a tetralogy of novels that continued with Still Life (1985), Babel Tower (1996) and A Whistling Woman (2002).

Byatt's novel Possession: A Romance received the 1990 Booker Prize, whilst her short story collection The Djinn in the Nightingale's Eye (1994) received the 1995 Aga Khan Prize for Fiction. Her novel The Children's Book was shortlisted for the 2009 Booker Prize and won the 2010 James Tait Black Memorial Prize. Her critical work includes two studies of Dame Iris Murdoch (who was a friend and mentor), Degrees of Freedom: The Early Novels of Iris Murdoch (1965) and Iris Murdoch: A Critical Study (1976). Her other critical studies include Wordsworth and Coleridge in Their Time (1970) and Portraits in Fiction (2001).

Byatt was awarded the Shakespeare Prize in 2002, the Erasmus Prize in 2016, the Park Kyong-ni Prize in 2017 and the Hans Christian Andersen Literature Award in 2018. She has been mentioned as a candidate for the Nobel Prize in Literature.

Early life
Byatt was born in Sheffield as Antonia Susan Drabble, the eldest child of John Drabble, QC, and Kathleen Bloor, a scholar of Browning. Her sisters are the novelist Margaret Drabble and the art historian Helen Langdon. Her brother Richard Drabble KC is a barrister. The Drabble father participated in the placement of Jewish refugees in Sheffield during the 1930s. The mother was a Shavian and the father a Quaker. As a result of the bombing of Sheffield during the Second World War the family moved to York.

Byatt was educated at two independent boarding schools, Sheffield High School and The Mount School, a Quaker boarding school at York. She noted in an interview in 2009, "I am not a Quaker, of course, because I'm anti-Christian and the Quakers are a form of Christianity but their religion is wonderful — you simply sat in silence and listened to the nature of things."

A "deeply unhappy" child, Byatt did not enjoy boarding school, citing her need to be alone and her difficulty in making friends. She attended Newnham College, Cambridge, Bryn Mawr College (in the United States), and Somerville College, Oxford. Having studied French, German, Latin, and English at school, she later studied Italian while attending Cambridge so that she could read Dante. "This means that I can actually read European literature with its own rhythms even if I have to have a side-by-side text for the difficult bits", she said in 1998.

Byatt lectured in the Department of Extra-Mural Studies of the University of London (1962–71), the Central School of Art and Design and from 1972 to 1983 at University College London. She began writing full-time in 1983.

Personal life
Byatt married Ian Charles Rayner Byatt in 1959 and moved to Durham. They had a daughter together, as well as a son, Charles, who was killed by a drunk-driver at the age of 11 whilst walking home from school. She spoke of her son's death and its influence on her lecturing and subsequent career after publishing The Children's Book, in which the image of a dead child features: Byatt said she wished to become a full-time writer, but "if I had a job we could send my son to a fee-paying school. My son got killed on Frank Kermode's doorstep, the day I accepted the job more or less — so there was no point in having the job except what else was I going to do". Byatt stayed in the job for "as long as he had lived, which was 11 years", then, she said, "it was like being released from a spell". She came to regard her academic career "very symbolically". She later wrote the poem "Dead Boys". The marriage was dissolved in 1969. Byatt has two daughters with her second husband, Peter Duffy.

Byatt's relationship with her sister Margaret Drabble has sometimes been strained due to the presence of autobiographical elements in both their writing. While their relationship is no longer especially close and they do not read each other's books, Drabble describes the situation as "normal sibling rivalry" and Byatt says it has been "terribly overstated by gossip columnists" and that the sisters "always have liked each other on the bottom line." Byatt is an agnostic and a grandmother. She is interested in snooker.

Influences
Byatt has been influenced by Henry James and George Eliot as well as Emily Dickinson, T. S. Eliot, Coleridge, Tennyson and Robert Browning, in merging realism and naturalism with fantasy. She is not an admirer of the Brontë family, admitting to finding their "joint imagination absolutely appalling". Nor does she like Christina Rossetti. She is ambivalent about D. H. Lawrence and also stated: "I don't like the English gentlemanly high-church sort of refined person, except for George Herbert, who is perfect and unexpected". She had learnt Jane Austen off before her teens.

In her books, Byatt alludes to, and builds upon, themes from Romantic and Victorian literature. She cited art historian John Gage's book on the theory of colour as one of her favourite books to reread. Frank Kermode she regarded as "writing criticism about a literature that one might hope to add things to. In a way, what Kermode said William Golding and Lawrence Durrell were doing was more important to me than what Golding or Durrell were doing", Byatt said in her interview for The Paris Review'''s "The Art of Fiction" series.

Writing
Fiction
Byatt wrote a lot whilst attending boarding school but had most of it burnt before she left.

She began writing her first novel whilst at the University of Cambridge, where she did not attend many lectures but when she did passed the time attempting to write a novel, which — given her limited experience of life — involved a young woman at university trying to write a novel, a novel, her novel, which — she knew — was "no good". She left it in a drawer when she was done. After departing Cambridge, she spent one year as a postgraduate student in the United States and there began her second novel, The Game, continuing to write it at Oxford when she returned to England. After getting married in 1959 and moving to Durham, she left The Game aside and resumed work on her earlier novel. She sent it to literary critic John Beer, whom she had befriended whilst at Cambridge and, she later said, "whose ideas, I think, run through almost everything I write". Beer sent Byatt's novel to the independent book publishing company Chatto & Windus. From there Cecil Day-Lewis wrote her a response and invited her to lunch at The Athenaeum, where he shared his thoughts on "poetry and Yeats and Auden and Shakespeare, and it was the literary conversation I had never had. When we got out on the pavement I rather tremblingly said, Might you be thinking of publishing this novel? He said, Oh yes, of course, of course". Day-Lewis was Byatt's first editor; D. J. Enright would succeed him.Shadow of a Sun, Byatt's first novel, is about a girl and her father and was published in 1964. It was reprinted in 1991 with its originally intended title, The Shadow of the Sun, intact. The Game, published in 1967, concerned the dynamics between two sisters. The reception for Byatt's first books became confused with her sister's writing, as well as her sister's quicker rate of publication.

The family theme is continued in The Quartet, Byatt's tetralogy of novels, which begins with The Virgin in the Garden (1978) and continues with Still Life (1985), Babel Tower (1996) and A Whistling Woman (2002). Her quartet is inspired by D. H. Lawrence, particularly The Rainbow and Women in Love. The family portrayed in the quartet are from Yorkshire. Byatt said the idea for The Virgin in the Garden came in part from an  class she taught in which she had read Tolstoy and Dostoevsky and in part from her time living in Durham in 1961, the year in which her son was born. The book was an attempt to understand what could be achieved if Middlemarch were written in the middle of the twentieth century. Byatt's book features a powerful death scene, which she invented in 1961 (inspired by Byatt's reading of Angus Wilson's book The Middle Age of Mrs Eliot and the accident in its opening), a death scene which has drawn complaints from numerous readers for its vividness. Describing mid-20th-century Britain, the books follow the life of Frederica Potter, a young intellectual studying at Cambridge at a time when women were heavily outnumbered by men at that university, and then tracing her journey as a divorcée with a young son as he makes a new life for herself in London. Byatt says some of the characters in her fiction represent her "greatest terror which is simple domesticity... I had this image of coming out from under and seeing the light for a bit and then being shut in a kitchen, which I think happened to women of my generation." Like Babel Tower, A Whistling Woman touches on the utopian and revolutionary dreams of the 1960s. Byatt described herself as "a naturally pessimistic animal": "I don't believe that human beings are basically good, so I think all utopian movements are doomed to fail, but I am interested in them."

Also an accomplished short story writer, Byatt's first published collection was Sugar and Other Stories (1987). The Matisse Stories (1993) features three pieces, each describing a painting by the eponymous painter, each the tale of an initially smaller crisis that shows the long-present unravelling in the protagonists' lives. The Djinn in the Nightingale's Eye, published in 1994, is a collection of fairy tales. Byatt's other short story collections are Elementals: Stories of Fire and Ice, published in 1998, and Little Black Book of Stories, published in 2003. Her books reflect a continuous interest in zoology, entomology, geology, and Darwinism among other repeated themes. She is also interested in linguistics and takes a keen interest in the translation of her books. Byatt said: "I can't say how important it was to me when Angela Carter said 'I grew up on fairy stories — they're much more important to me than realist narratives'. I hadn't had the nerve to think that until she said it, and I owe her a great deal". Carter, in an earlier (first) meeting with Byatt after a Stevie Smith poetry reading, had dismissed Byatt's work, so this change of heart vindicated Byatt's approach to writing and Byatt readily acknowledged it.Possession (1990) parallels the emerging relationship of two contemporary academics with the lives of two (fictional) 19th-century poets whom they are researching. It won the 1990 Booker Prize and was adapted for a film released in 2002.

Byatt's novella Morpho Eugenia was included in Angels & Insects (1992), which was turned into the eponymous 1995 film; that film received an Academy Award for Best Costume Design nomination in 1997.

Byatt's novel The Biographer's Tale, published in 2000, she originally intended as a short story titled "The Biography of a Biographer", based on her notion of a biographer's life in a library investigating another person's life. This she developed into writing about a character called Phineas G. Nanson, who is attempting to learn about a biographer for a book he intends to write but who can only locate fragments of his three unwritten biographies instead: on Galton, Ibsen and Linnaeus. Phineas Gilbert Nanson (to give him his full name) is called after an insect and is a near anagram of Galton, Ibsen and Linnaeus, though Byatt said this was an "uncanny" coincidence which she did not realise until afterwards.The Children's Book, published in 2009, is a novel spanning from 1895 until the end of the First World War and centring on the fictional writer Olive Wellwood. She is based upon E. Nesbit. Another character — Herbert Methley — is a combination of H. G. Wells and D. H. Lawrence, according to Byatt. The novel also features Rupert Brooke, Emma Goldman, Auguste Rodin, George Bernard Shaw, Virginia Woolf and Oscar Wilde, all appearing as themselves. Byatt initially intended to title the book as The Hedgehog, the White Goose and the Mad March Hare.

Byatt said in 2009: "I think of writing simply in terms of pleasure. It's the most important thing in my life, making things. Much as I love my husband and my children, I love them only because I am the person who makes these things. I, who I am, is the person that has the project of making a thing. Well, that's putting it pompously — but constructing. I do see it in sort of three-dimensional structures. And because that person does that all the time, that person is able to love all these people." Her preference for "making things" is also present in a 2003 interview, when she said: "I don't like to talk about creative writing, which is a vestigial religious tic in me. If anything is created, God does it. I don't. I make things--making is a nice word". She writes at her home in West London and at another house in the Cévennes in Southern France, where she spends her summers. She does not write her fiction on a computer, she does so by hand, though she has deployed a computer for non-fiction articles. According to a 1991 unpublished interview with the Los Angeles Times Book Review, Byatt said she began her writing day at around 10 a.m., prompting herself by reading something easy and then something harder: "And then after a bit if I read something difficult that's really interesting I get this itch to start writing. So what I like to do is to write from about half past twelve, one, through to about four". At this point, she said, she began reading again.

Criticism
Byatt wrote two critical studies of Dame Iris Murdoch, who was a friend, mentor and another significant influence on her own writing. They were titled Degrees of Freedom: The Early Novels of Iris Murdoch (1965) and Iris Murdoch: A Critical Study (1976). "[B]ecause I actually didn't want a mentor I found the friendship very difficult to handle... she simply used you as material", Byatt said. "She loved you very much but she would take you out to lunch and just fire questions at you like a clay pigeon shoot". Byatt also described Murdoch's husband John Bayley's decision to publish a memoir of his time with her as "wicked" and "unforgivable", saying: "I knew her enough to know that she would have hated it... it's had a horrible effect on how people feel about her and see her and think about her... Feelings were in her work but it wasn't restricted to feelings. There was thought in it. There was structure in it. An intelligent, complicated world."

Byatt's other critical studies include Wordsworth and Coleridge in Their Time (1970). 2001's Portraits in Fiction is about painting in novels, and features references to Emile Zola, Marcel Proust and Iris Murdoch; Byatt had earlier touched upon this subject in a 2000 lecture she delivered at the National Portrait Gallery in London.

She had no time for the so-called "angry young men", e.g. John Osborne and Kingsley Amis, and had little more time for Evelyn Waugh (though she considers him a superior artist to Amis), and, whilst she initially mistook Anthony Burgess for "another angry young man", she later realised her error and admitted he was "full of rich invention and a complete lack of narrowness". Georgette Heyer's books she finds "deeply moving".

Byatt has been a public encourager of the new young generation of British writers, including Philip Hensher (Kitchen Venom), Robert Irwin (Exquisite Corpse), A. L. Kennedy, Lawrence Norfolk, David Mitchell (Ghostwritten), Ali Smith (Hotel World), Zadie Smith (White Teeth) and Adam Thirlwell, saying in 2009 that she was "not entirely disinterested, because I wish there to be a literary world in which people are not writing books only about people's feelings... all the ones I like write also about ideas". She contrasted some of those preferences with the work of Martin Amis, Julian Barnes, Ian McEwan and Graham Swift — then added, "In fact I admire all four of those writers... they don't only do people's feelings... nevertheless it's become ossified". Norfolk she described in 2003 as "the best of the young novelists now writing". She also spoke of her admiration for American writer Helen DeWitt's book The Last Samurai.  Hensher, who counts Byatt as a friend, said: "She's very unusual for an English person, in that she's quite suspicious of comedy. With most people, sooner or later, every intellectual position comes down to a joke — it never does with her. This is where I think she fights with Kingsley Amis".

Questioned about whether her writing was "gendered", Byatt responded: "I've played with trying to understand what the word means, but use either "sex" or "men and women" instead, partly because the word gendered has caused a great many of my friends to write work that is bordering on not saying anything. I have always had a romantic idea that the writer or the artist was, as Coleridge and Virginia Woolf said, androgynous. The whole of The Virgin in the Garden quartet is about the desirability of an androgynous mind. I am too old for the women's movement in America or this country. I was fighting battles for the freedom of women, all by myself as I saw it, in the Fifties. I was partly amazed by the organised fight and partly appalled, because freedoms it had been hard for us to win--to be taken seriously by men as equal people to talk to--were suddenly thrown away by the idea that women should band together and talk to each other about each other, about women, and have Women's Studies in women's buildings.

I learnt never to write a list of my favourite painters or writers without women in, but equally I would never write one without men in. I don't think you can live in the world if the battle between the sexes is more important than communication between the sexes. It never was, to me--I like men. My father was one of the most important presences in my life and he was rational and sane and liked women".

Byatt has been a judge on many literary award panels, including the Betty Trask Award, the David Higham Prize for Fiction, the Hawthornden Prize and the Booker. She has also written for media, including for The Times Literary Supplement, British journal Prospect and newspapers The Guardian, The Independent and The Sunday Times.

Awards and honours

Byatt was appointed Commander of the Order of the British Empire (CBE) in the 1990 New Year Honours, and was promoted to Dame Commander of the Order of the British Empire (DBE), "for services to Literature", in Elizabeth II's 1999 Birthday Honours.

She has been mentioned as a candidate for the Nobel Prize in Literature.

In 2008, The Times named her on its list of the 50 greatest British writers since 1945.

1986: PEN/Macmillan Silver Pen Award, for Still Life1990: Booker Prize for Fiction, for Possession: A Romance1990: The Irish Times International Fiction Prize, for Possession: A Romance1991: Commonwealth Writers Prize (Eurasia Region, Best Book), for  Possession: A Romance1991: Honorary DLitt from the University of Durham
1993: Honorary LittD from the University of Liverpool
1994: Honorary Doctorate from the University of Portsmouth
1995: Honorary Doctorate from the University of London
1995: Premio Malaparte (Italy)
1995: Aga Khan Prize for Fiction, for The Djinn in the Nightingale's Eye1998: Mythopoeic Fantasy Award for Adult Literature, for The Djinn in the Nightingale's Eye1999: Honorary DLitt from the University of Cambridge
1999: Honorary Fellow, Newnham College, Cambridge
2002: Shakespeare Prize (Germany)
2004: Honorary Doctor of Letters from the University of Kent
2004: Honorary Fellow, University College London
2009: Blue Metropolis International Literary Grand Prix (Canada)
2009: Booker Prize shortlist, for The Children's Book2010: Honorary doctorate from Leiden University (Netherlands)
2010: James Tait Black Memorial Prize, for The Children's Book2016: Erasmus Prize (Netherlands), for "exceptional contribution to literature"
2017: Fellow of the British Academy of the British Academy
2017: Park Kyong-ni Prize (South Korea)
2017: Golden Plate Award of the American Academy of Achievement
2018: Hans Christian Andersen Literature Award (Denmark)

Memberships

 1987–1988: Kingman Committee of Inquiry into the teaching of English Language, (Department of Education and Science)
 1984–1988: Management Committee, Society of Authors (Deputy chairman, 1986, Chairman, 1986–1988)
 1993–1998: Board, British Council (Member of Literature Advisory Panel, 1990–1998)
 2014: American Academy of Arts and Sciences, Foreign Honorary Member

Works
Novels
The following books form a tetralogy known as The Quartet: The Virgin in the Garden (1978), Still Life (1985), Babel Tower (1996) and A Whistling Woman (2002).

 1964 – Shadow of a Sun, Chatto & Windus reprinted in 1991 with originally intended title The Shadow of the Sun 1967 – The Game, Chatto & Windus
 1978 – The Virgin in the Garden, Chatto & Windus
 1985 – Still Life, Chatto & Windus
 1990 – Possession: A Romance, Chatto & Windus
 1996 – Babel Tower, Chatto & Windus
 2000 – The Biographer's Tale, Chatto & Windus
 2002 – A Whistling Woman, Chatto & Windus
 2009 – The Children's Book, Chatto & Windus
 2011 – Ragnarok: The End of the Gods, Canongate 

Short story collections
 1987 – Sugar and Other Stories, Chatto & Windus
 1993 – The Matisse Stories, Chatto & Windus
 1994 – The Djinn in the Nightingale's Eye, Chatto & Windus
 1998 – Elementals: Stories of Fire and Ice, Chatto & Windus
 2003 – Little Black Book of Stories, Chatto & Windus

Novellas
 1992 – Angels and Insects, Chatto & Windus; comprises a pair of novellas:
 Morpho Eugenia The Conjugial AngelEssays and biographies
 1965 – Degrees of Freedom: The Early Novels of Iris Murdoch, Chatto & Windus
 1970 – Wordsworth and Coleridge in their Time, Nelson
 1976 – Iris Murdoch: A Critical Study, Longman
 1989 – Unruly Times: Wordsworth and Coleridge, Poetry and Life, Hogarth Press
 1991 – Passions of the Mind: Selected Writings, Chatto & Windus
 1995 – Imagining Characters: Six Conversations about Women Writers (with Ignes Sodre), Chatto & Windus
 2000 – On Histories and Stories: Selected Essays, Chatto & Windus
 2001 – Portraits in Fiction, Chatto & Windus
 2016 – Peacock & Vine: On William Morris and Mariano Fortuny, Knopf 

Texts edited
 1989 – George Eliot: Selected Essays, Poems and Other Writings (editor with Nicholas Warren), Penguin
 1995 – New Writing Volume 4 (editor with Alan Hollinghurst), Vintage
 1997 – New Writing Volume 6 (editor with Peter Porter), Vintage
 1998 – Oxford Book of English Short Stories (editor), Oxford University Press
 2001 – The Bird Hand Book (with photographs by Victor Schrager), Graphis Inc. (New York)

See also

References

Further reading
 Mundler, Helen E. (2003). Intertextualité dans l’œuvre d’A. S. Byatt (Intertextuality in the work of A. S. Byatt). Paris, Harmattan, 2003.  
 Hicks, Elizabeth (2010). The Still Life in the Fiction of A. S. Byatt. Newcastle upon Tyne: Cambridge Scholars Publishing. 
 Mundler, Helen E. "Time to murder and create? The Bible as intertext in A. S. Byatt’s Elementals: Stories of Fire and Ice". FAAAM, no. 4, 2010: 65–77.
 Gorski, Hedwig (2018). The Riddle of Correspondences in A. S. Byatt's Possession: A Romance with H. D.'s Trilogy.'' New Orleans: Jadzia Books.

External links

 
 
 
 
 
 
 

Audio interviews and readings
 
 
 Download: 
 
 

1936 births
Living people
Academics of University College London
Academics of the Central School of Art and Design
Alumni of Newnham College, Cambridge
Alumni of Somerville College, Oxford
Booker Prize winners
British women short story writers
Bryn Mawr College alumni
Dames Commander of the Order of the British Empire
English agnostics
English women novelists
English short story writers
Fellows of Newnham College, Cambridge
Fellows of the Royal Society of Literature
Fellows of Somerville College, Oxford
Honorary Fellows of the British Academy
James Tait Black Memorial Prize recipients
O. Henry Award winners
People educated at Sheffield High School, South Yorkshire
People educated at The Mount School, York
Pseudonymous women writers
The Guardian people
The Independent people
The Sunday Times people
20th-century British short story writers
20th-century English novelists
20th-century English women writers
20th-century pseudonymous writers
21st-century British short story writers
21st-century English novelists
21st-century English women writers
21st-century pseudonymous writers
Writers from Sheffield